Korulan (former Gezlevi) is a small town in Konya Province, Turkey.

Geography
Korualan is a part of Hadim district of Konya Province. At  it is quite far from the main state roads. The population is 1818 as of 2011

History
There are almost no written records about the deep history of Korualan. Probably, the town was a summer camp of the Turkmen tribes during Karamanid beylik (principality) during 13th–15th centuries. Korualan was a small village in the early 20th century. Korulan was declared a township in 1971.

Economy
Animal husbandry as well as fruit gardening (such as cherry)  are the most important economic activities. There are a few carpet weaving looms. But the unemployment rate is high and the younger generation tend to move to big cities to work in industry or in services.

References

Populated places in Konya Province
Towns in Turkey
Hadim District